Nguyễn Văn Sơn (born 25 February 2001) is a Vietnamese footballer.

Career statistics

Club

Notes

References

2001 births
Living people
Vietnamese footballers
Association football forwards
V.League 1 players
Than Quang Ninh FC players
Can Tho FC players
Saigon FC players
Azul Claro Numazu players
Vietnamese expatriate footballers
Vietnamese expatriate sportspeople in Japan
Expatriate footballers in Japan